Harbin Sport University is a university in Harbin, China, working with research on health and sports.

In 2015, the announcement of a new Olympic winter sports center was made, to be set up at Harbin Sport University.

The Harbin Sport University is one of the initiators and main heads of the China Bandy Federation. Most of the players in the China national bandy team are students at Harbin Sport University. The university is also providing support for ice hockey in China by educating young players and developing the coaching program for the Chinese Ice Hockey Association.

The University ice stadium served as venue for the B Division of the 2018 Bandy World Championship.

Animal Abuse Issues
Harbin Sport University was involved in a mass murder of dogs on September 12, 2016. This incident was in supposed preparation of their college's "Anniversary" the following day. The College sent their security guards to poison the dogs at a nearby shelter, leading to the slow agonizing death of all of the shelter's dogs and puppies. The shelter owner and caretaker, only known as Aunt Zhao, was inconsolably distraught at finding all of her strays poisoned. Aunt Zhao had dedicated much of her own time and resources to creating a safe place for these strays, an effort that was quickly undermined by the actions of Harbin Sport University.

References

Sports universities and colleges in China
Universities and colleges in Heilongjiang
Universities and colleges in Harbin
Educational institutions established in 1951
Bandy in China
1951 establishments in China